The 2020 South American U-17 Women's Championship was originally going be the seventh edition of the South American Under-17 Women's Football Championship, the biennial international youth football championship organised by CONMEBOL for the women's under-17 national teams of South America. It was scheduled to be held in Uruguay between 15 April and 3 May 2020, before its suspension and subsequent cancellation due to the COVID-19 pandemic.

The tournament was originally to be held in Venezuela from 15 April to 3 May 2020. However, CONMEBOL announced on 9 March 2020 that it would instead be held in Uruguay on the same dates.

CONMEBOL announced on 19 March 2020 that the tournament would be postponed to late August and early September due to the outbreak of COVID-19 pandemic in South America. On 1 June 2020, after FIFA postponed the 2020 FIFA U-17 Women's World Cup until February/March 2021 due to the COVID-19 pandemic, CONMEBOL announced that the tournament would be further postponed to November. On 6 August 2020, CONMEBOL confirmed that the tournament would be played between 30 November – 19 December 2020. On 30 October 2020, CONMEBOL further postponed the tournament to January 2021.

In November 2020 FIFA decided to cancel the 2021 FIFA U-17 Women's World Cup due to health and safety reasons related to the COVID-19 pandemic. Consequently, on 25 November, CONMEBOL announced that the tournament would be held in the second half of 2021 in order to complete the teams preparation cycle. Eventually, CONMEBOL decided to cancel the tournament during a meeting of its council held on 3 August 2021.

As the 2021 FIFA U-17 Women's World Cup was cancelled this tournament would not have served as qualifier for any FIFA U-17 Women's World Cup. Originally the top three teams would have qualified as the CONMEBOL representatives.

Brazil are the defending champions.

Teams
All ten CONMEBOL member national teams are eligible to enter the tournament.

Venues
The matches will be played in two venues in two cities.
Estadio Charrúa, Montevideo
Estadio Profesor Alberto Suppici, Colonia del Sacramento

Draw
To be confirmed.

Squads
Players born on or after 1 January 2003 are eligible to compete in the tournament.

Match officials
To be confirmed.

First stage
The top two teams of each group advance to the final stage.

All times local, UYT (UTC−3).

Group A

Group B

Final stage
The top three teams would have qualified for the 2021 FIFA U-17 Women's World Cup.

Winners

Goalscorers

References

External links
CONMEBOL Sub 17 Femenino Uruguay 2020, CONMEBOL.com

2020
2020 South American Under-17 Women's Football Championship
Youth sport in Uruguay
Under-17 Women's Football Championship
2020 in Uruguayan football
2020 in women's association football
2020 in youth association football
2020 FIFA U-17 Women's World Cup qualification
Association football events cancelled due to the COVID-19 pandemic